Duet Song Festival is a 2016 South Korean television program hosted by Sung Si-kyung and Yoo Se-yoon. It began to air on MBC on Fridays at 21:30 (KST) beginning April 8, 2016. Last episode of season 1 was broadcast on April 7, 2017.

On November 18, 2016 (episode 29), Baek Ji-young announced to leave the show as host due to her pregnancy.

Format
Not including pilot episodes: Seven celebrity artists choose a non-celebrity partner from a selection of people who submit performances to perform a duet of their choice. Each pair is given exactly 4 minutes to perform and earn votes from the 500 live voters in the audience and the celebrity panel. The order is selected by the current first place duo, and with the exception of the pilot episodes, the winner of the previous episode chooses the first performance. The voting results are shown directly on the screen behind the performers, and at the end of all the performances, the duo with the highest vote count is the winner for the episode. The winners are invited back to the show for the next episode, and another duo is chosen for "The Duet You Want To See Again" by the audience to be revived for the next episode as well.

Panel of celebrity supporters

2015–2016

2017

List of episodes
 – Winner
 – Duet You Want To See Again

2015–2016

2017

Ratings
In the table below,  represent the lowest ratings and  represent the highest ratings.

2015–2016

2017

Awards and nominations

International versions
 – Currently airing
 – Ceased to air
 – Undetermined

Notes

References

External links
 

2016 South Korean television series debuts
2017 South Korean television series endings
Korean-language television shows
MBC TV original programming
South Korean variety television shows
South Korean music television shows